Blademaster or blade master may refer to:

 BladeMaster, a BBS door similar to The Pit
 Blade Master, a 1991 arcade game
 Blademaster (Transformers), a Decepticon helicopter Transformer introduced in Transformers: The Veiled Threat
 Blademaster (Warcraft), a hero in WarCraft III
 Musashiden II: Blade Master, see Musashi: Samurai Legend
 Blade Master Alastor, see List of characters in the Viewtiful Joe series
 Blade Master, a character class in Dungeon Fighter Online
 Blade Master, a character class in Mu Online
 Blade Master, the English title of Ator 2 - L'invincibile Orion (1984)
 Blademaster, a character class in Revelation Online

See also
Master of Blades
 Drazhar, the Master Of Blades, see Dark Eldar
 Jindrax, Master of Blades, see Villains in Power Rangers: Wild Force

Master of the Blade
 Masters of the Blade, a book written by Rey Galang

Master of the Blades
 Master of the Blades, see Atha'an Miere

Other